The 2014 Kunshan explosion was a dust explosion that occurred at Zhongrong Metal Production Company, an automotive parts factory located in Kunshan, Jiangsu, China, on 2 August 2014. As of December 30, 2014, the explosion killed 146 workers and injured 114 others.

Event
A massive explosion occurred at the factory at 7:37 a.m. At the time, more than 260 people were present, which was more than the usual number of employees working since overtime wages were doubled during the weekends. 44 people died at the scene of the explosion, while another 31 died at local hospitals. Five hospitals in Kunshan and nearby Suzhou treated over 180 wounded. It is believed the explosion may have been caused by flames igniting metal polishing dust.

References

Kunshan explosion
Kunshan explosion
Kunshan explosion
Dust explosions
Kunshan explosion
History of Suzhou
Industrial fires and explosions in China
Kunshan